Christine Girard (born January 3, 1985) is a Canadian weightlifter from Rouyn-Noranda, Quebec (currently living in Gatineau, Quebec). She competes in the 63 kg division. Girard was the first Canadian female to win a medal in weightlifting when she won gold at the 2012 London Olympics. She also won Commonwealth Games and Pan American Games titles in her weight class and has won multiple medals in each of those competitions. She holds the Commonwealth games record and the Pan-American Games record in the Clean and Jerk.

Career
Weightlifting became a passion for Girard and her three sisters when they moved to Quebec. She began training early and entered her first provincial competition when she was 12. Girard became a member of the national team in 2001 at the age of 16 when she competed in Greece.  In 2002, she won a bronze medal at the Commonwealth Games which she improved upon in 2006 with a silver. At the 2006 University World Championships she won the bronze medal. She next won a silver at the 2007 Pan American Games. Girard then finished 8th at the 2007 World Weightlifting Championships with a total of 221 kg. Girard then entered the  2008 Summer Olympics, she improved upon this by finishing fourth, with a total of 228 kg and 3 kg away from a medal.

Girard built upon these achievements by finally winning a crown as champion when she won the gold medal at the 2010 Commonwealth Games in Delhi and completed her Commonwealth Games medal collection. En route to winning her gold Girard set a Commonwealth Games record in the snatch at 105 kg, in the clean and jerk she added an additional 130 kg for a total of 235 kg which were also Commonwealth records. Girard next conquered the 2011 Pan American Games when she won the gold in her weight class in Guadalajara.

At the 2012 Summer Olympics, Girard participated in the women's 63 kg. She finished fourth in the snatch portion, then second in the clean and jerk, lifting 133 kg. Her total of 236 kg put her third, behind Maiya Maneza and Svetlana Tsarukayeva. She became the first Canadian woman, and third Canadian overall, to win a medal in weightlifting. Girard said that winning the Olympic medal was one of her top two best moments in life, "It is very hard to describe how I feel. Four years ago in Beijing I came fourth, and since then I have spent the past four years training through injuries and various changes in my life to get to this moment. All I have been thinking about is getting on the podium. Now I have reached it. It feels good. I should say my wedding comes close, but this is completely different.''

In July 2016, the International Weightlifting Federation (IWF) reported that the IOC reanalyses of samples taken in 2012 uncovered prohibited anabolic agents in both the gold medalist and silver medalist. These were confirmed in 2018, making Girard the first Canadian gold medalist in female weightlifting since its introduction in 2000.  This was confirmed in April 2018.

After a reanalysis of the 2008 Beijing Olympics in August 2016, the IWF reported that silver medallist Irina Nekrassova had used a prohibited substance. This was confirmed in 2018 and Girard was awarded a bronze medal, preceding her previous standing of first female Canadian weightlifting medallist to 2008. Girard received both the Beijing bronze and London gold medals at a ceremony in Ottawa on December 3, 2018.

In 2019, Girard was inducted into the Canadian Olympic Committee's Hall of Fame.

Coaching
Girard began coaching other athletes in weightlifting after her move to BC while she was preparing for the 2012 Summer Olympics. Upon her return from the Olympic Games, Girard began coaching in a greater capacity.  She started her own weightlifting club – the Kilophile Weightlifting Club – and offers coaching services to other fitness centres notably in Crossfit Gyms.

Anti-Doping Advocacy 
Girard is involved in anti-doping advocacy work at both the domestic and international level. Girard is on the board of directors at the Canadian Centre for Ethics in Sport, the International Weightlifting Federation's Anti-Doping Commission and is an Education Ambassador with the International Testing Agency.

Personal life
Girard was born in Elliot Lake, Ontario but moved with her family to Rouyn-Noranda, Quebec in 1992 when she was seven. She then moved to White Rock, British Columbia in January 2010, before returning to Quebec in 2018, this time settling in the city of Gatineau in Canada's National Capital Region. Weightlifting was a family affair for Girard and her family continues to hold provincial and local roles for the sport in Quebec. On June 11, 2011 she married her coach Walter Bailey.  She has three children.

Occupational Therapy 
In 2021, Girard received her Masters of Health Sciences Degree in Occupational Therapy from the University of Ottawa. Girard is a practicing Occupational Therapist with Modern OT Occupational Services, and is registered with the College of Occupational Therapists of Ontario and Association canadienne des ergothérapeutes.

References

External links

 
 
 
 
 
 

1985 births
Living people
Canadian female weightlifters
Commonwealth Games gold medallists for Canada
Commonwealth Games silver medallists for Canada
Commonwealth Games bronze medallists for Canada
French Quebecers
Medalists at the 2008 Summer Olympics
Medalists at the 2012 Summer Olympics
Olympic gold medalists for Canada
Olympic bronze medalists for Canada
Olympic medalists in weightlifting
Olympic weightlifters of Canada
People from Elliot Lake
People from Rouyn-Noranda
People from White Rock, British Columbia
Sportspeople from British Columbia
Sportspeople from Quebec
Sportspeople from Ontario
Strength sportspeople from Ontario
Weightlifters at the 2002 Commonwealth Games
Weightlifters at the 2006 Commonwealth Games
Weightlifters at the 2010 Commonwealth Games
Weightlifters at the 2007 Pan American Games
Weightlifters at the 2008 Summer Olympics
Weightlifters at the 2011 Pan American Games
Weightlifters at the 2012 Summer Olympics
Commonwealth Games medallists in weightlifting
Pan American Games medalists in weightlifting
Pan American Games gold medalists for Canada
Pan American Games silver medalists for Canada
Medalists at the 2007 Pan American Games
Medalists at the 2011 Pan American Games
21st-century Canadian women
Medallists at the 2002 Commonwealth Games
Medallists at the 2006 Commonwealth Games
Medallists at the 2010 Commonwealth Games